Jenny Keni (born October 11, 1982) is a sprinter from the Solomon Islands.

Keni has represented her country at the 2000 Summer Olympics in Sydney and the 2004 Summer Olympics in Athens, as well as the 2002 Commonwealth Games. She also took part in the 2003 and 2007 World Athletics Championships, setting a national record in the former with a time of 12.64 seconds in the 100 metre sprint.

In the Solomon Islands Games in 2006, Keni won silver in the 100m sprint, and bronze in the 200m sprint.

Achievements

References

External links
 
 "Jenny Keni at the Games", Solomon Islands National Olympic Committee, August 21, 2004

Living people
Solomon Islands female sprinters
Olympic athletes of the Solomon Islands
Athletes (track and field) at the 2000 Summer Olympics
Athletes (track and field) at the 2004 Summer Olympics
Athletes (track and field) at the 2002 Commonwealth Games
Commonwealth Games competitors for the Solomon Islands
1982 births
Olympic female sprinters